Bruce Mackenzie was the Kenyan Minister of Agriculture, assassinated by Idi Amin in 1978.

Bruce Mackenzie may also refer to:

Bruce MacKenzie (Canadian politician) in 1959 Manitoba general election
Bruce Mackenzie, space activist, see Mars to Stay

See also
Mackenzie (surname)